Carlzon is a surname. Notable people with the surname include:

People 
 Cathrin Carlzon (born 1983), Swedish Olympic swimmer
 Jan Carlzon (born 1941), Swedish businessman
 Lars Carlzon (1918–2004), Swedish prelate and Bishop in Stockholm

See also 

Jacob Karlzon
 Karlsson (disambiguation)